The 2014 FEU Tamaraws men's basketball team represented Far Eastern University in UAAP's 77th men's basketball tournament. The team finished second after losing to NU Bulldogs in the finals in three games.

Departures

Roster

Game summaries

References

FEU Tamaraws basketball seasons
Tam